Broad Cove may refer to:

 Broad Cove, Newfoundland and Labrador, Canada
 Broad Cove (southern shore), Newfoundland and Labrador, Canada
 Small Point – Adam's Cove – Blackhead – Broad Cove, Newfoundland and Labrador, Canada
 Broad Cove, Lunenburg County, Nova Scotia, Canada